Plaskynaston Lane is a demolished football stadium in Cefn Mawr, Wrexham, Wales. It was the home stadium of Cefn Druids A.F.C. of the Cymru Alliance. The stadium held 2,000 spectators.

The last game played at the ground was the Tony Collins Memorial Cup Final U12, between Llay FC and Marford & Gresford FC, refereed by Lewys Evans in memory of a former Cefn Druids A.F.C. player.

Cefn Druids A.F.C. now play at the Rock, Rhosymedre.

The site is now used as a Tesco superstore.

External links
Stadium information

Football venues in Wales
Stadiums in Wrexham
Buildings and structures in Wrexham County Borough
Sport in Wrexham County Borough